The Almagellhorn (or Almagellerhorn) (3,327 m) is a mountain of the Pennine Alps, overlooking Saas Almagell, in the canton of Valais.

References

Landeskarte Der Schweiz: Saas 1,329 1:25,000

External links
 Almagellhorn on Hikr

Mountains of the Alps
Alpine three-thousanders
Mountains of Valais
Mountains of Switzerland